Euphoria (Hindi: युफ़ोरिया) is an Indian pop rock band formed by Dr. Palash Sen in 1998 in Delhi, India. The name "Euphoria", is a term used in Psychiatry to describe a feeling one gets in the state of Mania, was decided upon by Palash, who at the time was a student of medicine at the University College of Medical Sciences, Delhi.

Euphoria has released 7 studio albums and are one of India's highest-selling artists and the highest-selling band ever. They have released 16 singles by adopting the DIY method, and embracing the digital revolution in the music industry. They were inducted into the Hall of Fame in 2012 by the Indian Recording Arts Academy at the Palm Expo in Mumbai.

Early years and the first album Dhoom (1988–1999)

Euphoria was formed in 1988 by a then medical student Dr. Palash Sen and his friends. Bass player Debajyoti Bhaduri joined hands with Palash in the early nineties. Moving through several line-ups, the band kept searching for their elusive break. It came 10 years after their inception when Euphoria released their first studio album titled 'Dhoom' in the October 1998 to critical acclaim and commercial success. They became the pioneers of 'Hind Rock' or rock music in Hindi. Their first single was titled 'Dhoom Pichuk Dhoom' – and it became the most popular video to hit TV screens in that decade. Directed by ad-guru and filmmaker Pradeep Sarkar, the video became a benchmark for non-Bollywood music videos. Two other videos were shot and released for the songs "Tum" and " Sha Na Na" the same year. During this time the band even included the legendary Gussy Rikh, whose musical dexterity helped improve the band's often one-dimensional sound.

Influences
Initially rooted in English rock the band through its various line-up changes, found its calling in the sound of fusion rock music arrangements with Hindi lyrics and melodies. With the release of their debut album “Dhoom” in 1998, Euphoria was the first indigenous band that became a household name.

Phir Dhoom and Mantra (1999–2002)
After the success of 'Dhoom', Euphoria started work on their second studio album 'Phir Dhoom' and delivered hit singles such as 'Phir Dhoom', 'Rok Sako To Rok Lo', and 'Pyar Hi Tha'. But it was their first single 'Maaeri' (an instrumental launching the career of Rimi Sen) which became their most successful song and their trademark tune. It was during the recording of this album, that Palash asked Tabla Player Prashant Trivedi and Percussionist Rakesh Bhardwaj to join the band. Two back-to-back hit records had already cemented Euphoria as a powerful musical force. The band toured heavily this time, to promote the record and also played at the Beale Street Music Festival in Memphis in 2000. In 2001, Euphoria became the first ever band to play inside the United Nations General Assembly along with Junoon from Pakistan. After returning to the country, the band released "Mantra", India's first ever standalone single release, independent of an album.

‘Mantra' established their unique hind rock resonance which was an eclectic mixture of Indian and global sounds. It was during this time that front man Palash shot for the film Filhaal, which was released the same year.

Mehfuz, REDhoom, Best of Luck and Line Up Change (2006–2010)
In 2006, the band's fourth studio album 'Mehfuz' surprised critics and fans alike. The new sound and the maturity in the songwriting won a lot of hearts and made Euphoria the only force in Indian music which could commercially take on Bollywood. Four music videos were released for the songs 'Soneya', 'Mehfuz', 'Bewafaa', and 'Rab Jaane'. Mehfuz was the first album that the band recorded in their newly made studio "The Clinic". The band's current drummer, Ashwani Verma, joined the band during this time.

In 2008, the band completed 10 years of their recording career and released 'Re Dhoom'a commemorative compilation album consisting of 12 of Euphoria's biggest hits with a music video of the song 'Bhoola Sab'.

Following personal differences and misunderstandings, Palash asked the then guitarist and keyboardist Hitesh Madan and Benjamine Pinto to leave the band.

During a brief hiatus that the band took from playing live, Euphoria created music for the Malayalam Film "Best of Luck" released in late 2010. Indian Guitar Legend Kalyan Baruah played guitars on the songs. Kalyan also appeared live with Euphoria on 2 occasions, and later also guested on their 2011 MTV Unplugged appearance.

Axeman Amborish Saikia and Keyboard player Vinayak Gupta completed Euphoria's line up and brought about a total change in Euphoria's sound with their cutting edge nu age musicianship. Euphoria was sounding younger, better and more aggressive than ever.

Item (2011)
In 2011, the band released their fifth studio album titled "Item" and embarked on a 10 city tour of USA to promote it. Euphoria also made an appearance on MTV Unplugged's Indian edition the same year and performed "ITEM" and "C U Later" from the new album, along with their other hits. In the first week of May, Euphoria released the second single "C U Later" from Item in two languages, Hindi and English. A music video to support the promotions was also created in both languages, making it Euphoria's first bilingual single. The single went on to peak at number 5 on VH1 India's Top Ten charts. Item was released worldwide by Universal Music India.

Sharnaagat (2012 Onwards)
Euphoria launched their 6th studio album titled "Sharnaagat" in 2012, surprising critics and fans with a new direction. Sharnaagat was the band's first spiritual record, with influences of pop, folk and blues. Frontman Palash's late father, Dr. Rupendra Kumar Sen, had composed 3 out of the 7 songs featured on the album. A music video was shot for the title track "Sharnaagat" in the premises of a Temple, Mosque, Church and a Gurudwara in Delhi with an attempt to portray the universality of God and religion. Palash directed the video with the entire band and its support staff doubling up as the production crew. Sharnaagat was released worldwide by Times Music Spiritual.

Music Video Halla Bol (2016) 
Euphoria launched their brand new single on 21 June 2016, co-written by Palash Sen and Deekshant Sahrawat, Halla Bol, also composed and led by as vocalist by Palash, describes the song as “the war cry of the meek, the quiet and the non-pretentious common man. This almost six-minute song features the band’s commentary on India’s various issues with spoofs on Arvind Kejriwal, Arnab Goswami, Vijay Mallya and Aamir Khan’s ‘PK’.

Discography

Films
The band has composed the soundtrack for a Malayalam film named Best of luck (2010).

Albums 
Albums and Singles of Euphoria is listed below:

 1998 – Dhoom
 2000 – Phir Dhoom
 2003 – Gully
 2006 – Mehfuz
 2008 – ReDhoom
 2011 – Item
 2012 – Sharnaagat
 2021 - Sale

Singles
 2001 – Mantra
 2017 – Halla Bol
 2018 – Alvida

Songs 
 Dhoom Pichak Dhoom
 Sha Na Na
 Maeri
 Phir Dhoom
 Raja Rani
 Ab Naa Jaa
 Aana Meri Gully
 Sone De Maa
 Soneya
 Mehfuz
 Bhoola Sab
 Ram Ali
 C U Later
 Kabootar
 Item
 Sharnaagat
 Prabhuji
 Sheranwali Maa
 mola mere mola
 Halla Bol
 Iktarfa
Danger Babua
Mujhse Kaha Naa Gaya
Saajna
Ladaaii
Walk On
Sale
Saahiba
Baavra
Kesariya Baalmaa
Khwaamkhaa
Saajna
I Like It

Collaborations
 2004 – Jeet Lo Dil feat. Strings
 2010 – Delhi Meri Jaan. (for the Commonwealth Games 2010 New Delhi)
 2019 – Saajna feat Akriti Kakar

2021 - Saajna feat Dino James
2021 - Baavra feat Kyna Sen

Key facts
Dr. Palash Sen is also an actor, who acted in the Bollywood movie called Filhaal. Also, Palash has starred in a film called Mumbai Cutting, in which he plays the lead role. Euphoria created the background score to this movie.

References

External links
 IndianMusicMug News – Euphoria launches New single C U Later
 Euphoria

Indian musical groups
Musical groups established in 1988
Pop-folk music groups